The Grand Comoro bulbul (Hypsipetes parvirostris) is a species of songbird in the bulbul family, Pycnonotidae.
It is found on the Comoro Islands. 
Its natural habitat is subtropical or tropical moist montane forests. Until 2011, the Moheli bulbul was considered as a subspecies of the Grand Comoro bulbul. Alternative names for the Grand Comoro bulbul include the Comoro bulbul and Grand Comoro black bulbul.

References

Grand Comoro bulbul
Endemic birds of the Comoros
Grande Comore
Gran Comoro bulbul
Taxonomy articles created by Polbot